Fung Lok Wai is an area of Yuen Long District that features fish ponds.

Location
Fung Lok Wai is located south of the Inner Deep Bay, between Yuen Long Industrial Estate and Hong Kong Wetland Park. Immediately south of Fung Lok Wai are the villages of is Ng Uk Tsuen and Shing Uk Tsuen of Wang Chau. Kai Shan is located to the immediate southwest of Fung Lok Wai.

History
In the early 20th century, and before the 1920s, the area was the site of swamp and marsh. The mangrove swamp was initially reclaimed for rice cultivation. During the period between 1938 and 1945 the Deep Bay area was transformed into gei wai. The fish ponds were first used in the 1920s for harvesting of shrimp, fish and crabs. They were historically owned by people from Shek Ha in mainland China and several Tanka families. By 1974 the land use of the area was converted to ponds for raising fresh water fish.

Conservation
 "Inner Deep Bay" is listed as a Site of Special Scientific Interest.

See also
 Nam Sang Wai
 Mai Po Marshes
 Shan Pui River

References

Further reading
 
 Irving Richard T.A. and Leung Kai Wing 1987. Land-use and land-use change in the reclaimed coastal areas of Deep Bay. 

Yuen Long District